Carex appendiculata is a species of sedge. It is native to northern and eastern Asia and New Guinea.

References

appendiculata
Flora of Asia
Flora of New Guinea
Taxa named by Georg Kükenthal
Plants described in 1903